The 2011–12 Liga Nacional de Fútbol de Guatemala season is the 13th season in which the Apertura and Clausura season is used. The season began on 9 July 2011 and will end in May 2012.

Format
The format for both championships are identical. Each championship will have two stages: a first stage and a playoff stage. The first stage of each championship is a double round-robin format. The teams that finishes 1 and 2 in the standings will advance to the playoffs semifinals, while the teams that finish 3–6 will enter in the quarterfinals. The winner of each quarterfinals will advance to the semifinals. The winners of the semifinals will advance to the finals, which will determine the tournament champion.

Teams
USAC and Xinabajul finished in 11th and 12th place, respectively, in the overall table of last season and were relegated to the Primera División. Taking their places were the two winners of the Primera División promotion playoffs, Petapa and Zacapa.

Torneo Apertura
The 2011 Torneo Apertura began on 9 July 2011 and ended on 18 December 2011.

Standings

Results

Top scorers

Positions by round

Playoffs

Quarterfinals

First legs

Second legs

Municipal progresses 2–0 on aggregate.

Comunicaciones progresses on away goals rule.

Semifinals

First legs

Second legs

Comunicaciones progresses 4–2 on aggregate.

Municipal progresses 3–2 on aggregate.

Finals

First leg

Second leg

Torneo Clausura
The 2012 Torneo Clausura will begin on 14 January 2012 and will end in May 2012.

Personnel and sponsoring

Standings

Results

Top scorers

Positions by round

Playoffs

Quarterfinals

First legs

Second legs

Semifinals

First legs

Second legs

Finals

First leg

Second leg

Aggregate table

External links
 Guatefutbol 

Liga Nacional de Fútbol de Guatemala seasons
1
Guatemala